Thee Arthur Campbell (born March 5, 1948) was a former American football running back in the National Football League who played for the Atlanta Falcons. He played college football for the Northern Arizona Lumberjacks.

References

1948 births
Living people
American football running backs
Atlanta Falcons players
Northern Arizona Lumberjacks football players